Hannah Cheesman is a Canadian actress and filmmaker. As a performer, Cheesman is known for portraying Lieutenant Commander Airiam in the second season of the CBS television series Star Trek: Discovery. As a filmmaker, Cheesman has written and directed the short film Succor, starring Deragh Campbell and Michaela Kurimsky, which premiered at the 2020 Toronto International Film Festival. She won several accolades for her performance and work writing and producing the web series Whatever, Linda in 2014.

Career

Early work 
Cheesman began her career starring in several short and feature films, including Ingrid Veninger's low-budget independent film The Animal Project, which premiered at the 2013 Toronto International Film Festival.

Whatever, Linda 

In 2014, Cheesman co-created, wrote, produced, and starred in the critically acclaimed web series Whatever, Linda. For her work on the series, she received several accolades, and was nominated for a Canadian Screen Award for Best Performance in a Program or Series Produced for Digital Media and for Best Original Program or Series produced for Digital Media.

Whatever, Linda has been in development with Bell Media and Orphan Black creator Graeme Manson for several years, with Cheesman slated to co-create, write, produce, and potentially star.

Short films and television work 
In 2018, she wrote and directed the short film Emmy, which was selected to screen in the National Screen Institute's Online Short Film Festival. She has also worked in the writers rooms of Orphan Black and Workin' Moms.

In 2019, she starred as Lieutenant Commander Airiam in the second season of the CBS television series Star Trek: Discovery. The New York Times called her performance in the series "a real highlight". That year, she also guest-starred in an episode of the CBC series Schitt's Creek.

Filmography

Film

Television

Video games

References

External links 

 

21st-century Canadian actresses
Canadian film actresses
Canadian television actresses
Canadian web series actresses
Living people
Year of birth missing (living people)